Ato Essilfi Bracato Essandoh (born July 29, 1972) is an American television and film actor.

Early life 
Essandoh was born in Schenectady, New York to Ghanaian parents and graduated from New Rochelle High School in 1990. He received a B.S. in chemical engineering from Cornell University. He first joined theater when he was dared to do so by a girlfriend. He studied acting under James Price at The Acting Studio - New York in New York City. He is also a playwright, and authored Black Thang which is published in the anthology Plays and Playwrights 2003. Essandoh is the co-founder of The Defiant Ones writing and performance group.

Career 
He launched  a podcast, Unrelated, together with his childhood friend Chris Cecot.

Filmography

Film

Television

Video Games

References

External links
 
 Interview with Ato Essandoh at Moniqueblog.net

1972 births
American people of Ghanaian descent
African-American male actors
American male film actors
American male television actors
Cornell University College of Engineering alumni
Living people
20th-century African-American people
New Rochelle High School alumni
Male actors from New Rochelle, New York
Actors from Schenectady, New York
21st-century American male actors
21st-century African-American people